In mathematics and theoretical physics, a bifundamental representation is a representation obtained as a tensor product of two  fundamental or  antifundamental representations.

For example, the MN-dimensional representation (M,N) of the group 
 

is a bifundamental representation. 

These representations occur in quiver diagrams.

Abstract algebra